Harlaxton may refer to:

 Harlaxton, a village in Lincolnshire, England
RAF Harlaxton, a former airfield nearby
 Harlaxton Manor, a manor house
 Harlaxton, Queensland, a suburb of Toowoomba, Australia
 Harlaxton House, a heritage-listed house